The UAAP Final Four refers to the postseasons of the University Athletic Association of the Philippines (UAAP) tournaments. The term "final four" came from the National Collegiate Athletic Association of the United States' men's Division I basketball tournament which is colloquially called as the "final four" in that country. "Final Four" is now a registered trademark exclusive to the American NCAA and no other organizing body within the U.S. can use that name in referring to their tournaments.

History
The Final Four in which the four teams (out of eight) with the best records qualify for the postseason playoff games was instituted in Season 56 (1993–94). Previously the postseason was a championship series between the top two teams, with the No. 1 seeded team holding the twice to beat advantage, i.e., they have to win only once to clinch the championship. The No. 2 team has to win twice.

The tournament is now conducted in three stages with the institution of the Final Four playoffs:
The two-round preliminaries, where a team plays the other teams twice. The four teams with the worst records are eliminated.
The semifinals, wherein the No. 1 seeded team plays the 4th seeded team and the No. 2 seeded team plays the 3rd seeded team. Both No. 1 and No. 2 seeded teams possess the twice to beat advantage, while the No. 3 and No. 4 teams have to win twice.
The finals, which is a best of three series.

On the first year of the implementation of the Final Four playoffs, the University of Santo Tomas swept the group stage, and following the then existing rules, the Glowing Goldies were awarded the championship outright. After that season, the UAAP revised the rule so that the team that sweeps the regular stage will instead advance to the best-of-3 Finals automatically. While the No. 2 team will have the twice to beat advantage in the semifinals where it awaits the winner of the game between the No. 3 and No. 4 teams.

The revised postseason format was implemented in Season 57 (1994–95) but it was not until Season 70 (2007–08) that a team swept the group stages. The University of the East was the first to accomplish this feat under the new format, causing the sweep clause to be used. UE thus automatically advanced to the Finals but this reward became a bane as the Red Warriors had to wait for 21 days before the championship series can be started due to several factors, namely, the unavailability of the playing venue (Araneta Coliseum), two tie-breaker games and two semifinal games. The Red Warriors became rusty, so to speak, causing them to lose the championship series 2–0 against La Salle (their last group stage opponent). As a result, the Policy Board formulated the "bonus rule" in which the team that sweeps the group stages will qualify for the Finals outright and will have a thrice-to-beat advantage. This meant that the number 1 seeded team will only need to win twice; the other finalist needs to win thrice, thus giving the sweeper a 1–0 lead in a virtual best-of-five.

Ties among the semifinalists were broken by an extra game, irrespective of the seedings. Ergo, in a tie for the 2nd seed, the game that will be used to break the tie serves as a de facto game one of a best-of-three series. If two teams are tied for the fourth seed, the game that will be used to break the tie serves as a knockout game between the two. If three or more teams are tied, the team with the best points difference gets a bye to the final tie-breaker game against the winner/s of the teams with the lower points difference. In Season 72 (2009–10), the league introduced the "common sense" rule in determining seedings for the playoffs in case of ties. This means not all ties in the semifinals will be broken by a one-game playoff. Only ties for second and fourth are broken by an extra game. Ties for first and third are broken by the points difference of the tied teams. Starting Season 79, however, the thrice-to-beat advantage for the top-seeded team (in cases of the double group stage sweep) was removed, but the stepladder semifinals format (second-seeded team still with the twice-to-beat advantage against the 2 lower-seeded teams in the Final Four) and the automatic Finals slot incentive for the top-seeded team remained.

Format
Regular Final Four Round - If no team sweeps the group stage:
Seeds No. 1 and No. 2 teams possess the twice-to-beat advantage
Team No. 1 meets No. 4 while No. 2 meets No. 3 in the semifinals.
The semifinal winners advance to the Finals.
The team that wins 2 games in the Finals wins the championship.
Stepladder Final Four Format - If a team sweeps the group stage:
Seed No. 1 advance to the Finals.  
Seed No. 2 advance to the semifinals with the twice-to-beat advantage.
Teams No. 3 and No. 4 face off to meet No. 2 in the semifinals in a one-game playoff.
In the finals, either the No. 1 seed or the other opponent has to win only twice. From 2008 to 2016, seed No. 1 earned a thrice-to-beat advantage (or a 1−0 incentive lead in a best-of-five Finals series). The No. 1 seed only had to win twice, while the other opponent had to win thrice.
In case of two teams being tied, an extra game will be played to determine which seed they will possess.
In case of three or more teams being tied, the team with the best head-to-head record usually possesses the best seeding, while the other teams will play an extra game to determine the second-best seeding,

Results

Television and radio
The Final Four is heavily covered by the media. With the UAAP as one of the leading collegiate leagues in the country, the Final Four games are broadcast live throughout the country.

From 2000 to 2020, the UAAP Finals and the Final Four games, were broadcast by ABS-CBN's UHF channel Studio 23 nationwide and produced by ABS-CBN Sports. Prior to Studio 23, the games were broadcast by Silverstar Sports on the state-controlled People's Television VHF channel 4. Since  July 2009, the UAAP is also aired in high definition through cable channel Balls, via their channel Balls HD. Upon signing a new contract at the conclusion of UAAP Season 72 in October 2009, the Finals will be aired through VHF television channel ABS-CBN 2, beginning in 2010 and renewed again in October 2013 at the conclusion of UAAP Season 76. Prior to 2001, the games were also aired live on DZSR Sports Radio 918-AM; after ABS-CBN's takeover of broadcast rights, its Manila FM station 101.9 For Life! aired updates during and after the games, but not blow-by-blow coverages. In 2010, radio coverage of the games were aired on DZRJ-AM 810.

Starting the 2021-2022 season, with the ongoing COVID-19 pandemic and the closure of ABS-CBN on free television since 2020, the UAAP has signed new broadcast rights with Cignal TV, resulting in the establishment of the UAAP Varsity Channel dedicated to live broadcasts and archived games of the league across selected events. One Sports and TV5 have also signed in to televise the games live nationwide, with the latter catering to all post-season matches for both basketball and volleyball tournaments.

Statistics

Appearances

Notes:
 Number of appearance excludes 4th seed elimination games.

Best performances

Number denotes playoff seeding.
Shade denotes final position.

Notes:
a.2021-22 season was played in early 2022.

Win–loss statistics

Entire playoffs

Series statistics

Finals

Finals statistics
Most lopsided game: La Salle 72–47 FEU, 1998 Game 1 (25 points)
Closest game: Several games, all one-point leads:
UST 73–72 La Salle, 2013 Game 1
La Salle 64–63 UE, 2007 Game 1
Ateneo 73–72 UST, 2006 Game 1
FEU 65–64 La Salle, 1997 Game 2 (championship clincher)
UST 77–76 La Salle, 1994 Game 3
Most number of overtime games: 2
UP 81-74 Ateneo, 2021-22 Game 1
UP 72-69 Ateneo, 2021-22 Game 3
Finals appearances: La Salle, 16
Consecutive finals appearances: La Salle, 9 (1994–2002)
Championships: Ateneo (2002, 2008–12, 2017–19, 2022), 10; La Salle (1998–2001, 2007, 2013, 2016), 7; UST (1993–96, 2006; including UST's 1993 sweep), FEU (1997, 2003–05, 2015), 5
Note: FEU was awarded the 2004 championship title due to La Salle's fielding of ineligible players from 2003 to 2005 thus forfeiting their wins and revoking La Salle's final team standings from those seasons.
Longest streak of consecutive championships: Ateneo (2008–12), 5.
As of 2022, the winner of Game 1 won the championship 20 times out of 28 (71%).

Semifinals statistics
Most lopsided game: La Salle vs NU, 111–85, 2001 (26 points)
Closest game: Several games, all one-point wins.
 UP 70–69 FEU, 1997 Game 1 (1 point) 
 FEU 70–69 UP, 1997 Game 2 (1 point)
 UST 75–74 Ateneo, 1999 (1 point)
 FEU 61–60 Ateneo, 2000 Game 1 (1 point)
 UST 82–81 UE, 2006 Game 2 (1 point)
 Ateneo 65–64 La Salle, 2007 Game 1 (1 point)
 FEU 62–61 Ateneo, 2016 Game 1 (1 point)
 Ateneo 69–68 FEU (OT), 2016 Game 2 (1 point)
Semifinal appearances:FEU, (1994–95, 1997-2001, 2003–05, 2008–11, 2013–21), 22, Ateneo, (1999-2012, 2014–22), 22, La Salle, (1994-2005, 2007–08, 2010, 2012–14, 2016–17, 2021), 21,  UST, (1994-2000, 2002, 2006-07, 2009, 2011-13, 2015, 2019) 16
Consecutive semifinal appearances: Ateneo (1999–2012), 14

Most frequent matchups
The most frequently played matchups are:

Seeds
In the 28 tournaments the Final Four format has been applied, the higher seed has beaten the lower seeds in the semifinals due to their twice to beat advantage, for the most part:
 The No. 1 seed has beaten the No. 4 seed in 24 out of the 26 times (92%).
The No. 1 seed has beaten the No. 4 seed 19 times on the first game (79%).
The No. 1 seed has beaten the No. 4 seed 5 times on the second game (21%).
The only times the No. 1 seed was beaten by the No. 4 seed were during the NU-UST matchup in 2013 (UST won), and the Ateneo-NU matchup in 2014 (NU won).
 The No. 2 seed has beaten the No. 3 seed 19 out of 27 times (70%).
 The No. 2 seed has beaten the No. 3 seed 14 times on the first game (74%).
 The No. 2 seed has beaten the No. 3 seed 5 times on the second game (26%).
Out of the 8 times the No. 2 seed was beaten, the No. 2 seed was UE thrice (38%) and Adamson twice (25%).
 The No. 4 seed has beaten the No. 2 seed 1 out of 1 times (100%).
The only time the No. 2 seed was beaten by the No. 4 seed was during the UST-UP matchup in 2019 (UST won) due to the stepladder format.
 The No. 3 seed has beaten the No. 4 seed 1 out of 2 times (50%).
 With UE sweeping the group stage, there were two semifinal rounds for 2007.
 With Ateneo sweeping the group stage, there were two semifinal rounds for 2019.
The No. 1 seed skipped the semifinals twice (7%; in 2007, when UE swept the group stage, and in 2019, when Ateneo swept the group stage)
A victory of the No. 3 seed in a series is considered a big upset considering that the No. 3 seed has to win twice, not to mention the perceived superiority of the No. 2 seed when compared to the No. 3 seed.

In the finals, the advantage of the No. 1 seed isn't as pronounced since the competing teams have to win the same number of games:
 The No. 1 seed has beaten the No. 2 seed 11 of 17 times (65%)
 The No. 1 seed has beaten the No. 3 seed 5 of 8 times (63%)
 The No. 1 seed has beaten the No. 4 seed 1 of 1 times (100%)
 The No. 2 seed has beaten the No. 1 seed 6 of 17 times (35%)
 The No. 2 seed has beaten the No. 4 seed 1 of 2 times (50%)
 The No. 3 seed has beaten the No. 1 seed 3 of 8 times (38%)
 The No. 4 seed has beaten the No. 2 seed 1 of 2 times (50%)
 The No. 1 seed has won the championship 17 of 28 times (61%)

Individual single-game records
Stats since the 2001 season.
*game went into overtime.

See also
NCAA Final Four (Philippines)

References

Final Four